MicroWorlds JR is a computer program using a simplified version of the Logo programming language to teach non-readers or early readers to program in Logo. It was first launched in 2004 by Logo Computer Systems, Inc. (LCSI), and as in their original line of MicroWorlds programs, the object on the screen begins as a turtle and can be controlled with basic commands to make it move. Differing from the Logo syntax developed by Seymour Papert and teams at MIT, MicroWorlds JR uses images to replace the command names, which are selected by the child to create turtle graphics. The turtle object can be given a variety of shapes that act as a costume for the turtle, and therefore lends itself to a variety of animations and creative stories and projects for younger students.

Constructivist Learning Theory
MicroWorlds JR supports constructivism by putting control in the hands of the student.  The program allows the child to interact actively with the computer, applying logic and problem solving skills to create their own 'microworld', often through project-based learning.
Constructivists believe that:
children are innate, natural learners
all people have the desire and ability to learn
learning is a social activity
development results from interaction between students and a stimulating intellectual environment
when cognitive conflicts arise, effective learning may follow
teachers can promote development of knowledge through apprenticeship and dialogue

Constructionism and the Spirit of Logo
Seymour Papert and Idit Harel have developed Constructionist learning theory, based upon the premise that children learn best by making things, not just by doing.  Being involved in the creation of that which is new enables the teacher to join students as an authentic co-learner, thereby modelling the strategies of expert learners.  Working through problems enhances a child's ability to see transfer in the knowledge they have acquired, and when creating with Logo much of the learning has to do with 'debugging' the programs to see intended results,  as well as the understanding of what is relevant and efficient in deciphering and creating the code (Skillen, 2003).
MicroWorlds JR involves the principles of constructionism that engage young learners:
the creation of that which is new ensures that the teacher is an authentic co-learner along with students
the role of the teacher changes from the traditional role of transmitting information to one of facilitator or guide
the construction of a concrete product not only ensures that the child will strive for something that works effectively,  but it will also be available for public scrutiny, sharing,  discussion and reflection
while working through authentic projects students are involved in building personally meaningful artifacts that demonstrate their knowledge
learners are diverse; they make connections with knowledge in many different ways and therefore are given a variety of choices in how to demonstrate their learning (Kafai and Resnick, 1996)
technology tools can be used to create something of importance (Resnick, 2002)
learners will be more likely to persevere to solve problems when topics and projects are of personal interest

Applications for Primary Teachers

Logo
Logo is a computer programming language that requires the student to interact with the turtle (object), and give it commands to make it move.  For example, to draw a square. The turtle would need to put its pen down, step forward 60 paces, turn 90 degrees and then repeat these two commands four times.  Students need to think carefully  to command the turtle in a logical manner, and then check to see whether they create the desired effect.  Alternatively, procedures can be written whereby students group the commands together and have the actions executed all at once.  Older students might type this command using logo as:
To squareRepeat 4 [forward 60 right 90]
End

In MicroWorlds JR, the same procedure would be created graphically:

Using the Turtle Shapes and Turtle Commands Centre, students can create geometric shapes and designs by executing the pendown command and commanding the turtle to move step by step, or by writing procedures to create shapes.  They can hatch more than one turtle at a time, and by right-clicking on the turtle they open a backpack in which they store and edit their commands.  

Alternatively, students can also embed procedures within other procedures thus creating subprocedures, all done with graphic representations of computer code.  Procedures and commands can be created on click, on colour, on touch and on signal, which allows the student to create animated, interactive stories or simple video games.  Narration or verbal directions and sounds, as well as buttons to flip from page to page, can be added to enhance the projects.  

The following textual logo commands are represented iconically using MicroWorlds JR and they are shown in the turtle command centre. 

forward
backward
turn right and left
wait
stop
pen up
pen down
hide turtle
show turtle
head north
set pen colour and size
go home    
The graphics are put together to form commands, for example, the step graphic selects the forward or backward commands which set the direction the turtle will move, and children then choose a number of steps using a sliding grid.

Multimedia Authoring
On the left hand side of the student desktop, tools are provided to help students create multimedia projects and to add graphics and backgrounds to their work. The following table illustrates the functions of the Tool Centres.

Curriculum Connections
MicroWorlds JR can be integrated into primary programs in a wide range of projects
patterns and geometry
multimedia reports and stories
interactive pages
procedural and descriptive writing
mazes and simple video games
comparisons and measurement
creating and exploring simple simulations and animations
transformational geometry
creating, then testing and reflecting upon hypotheses
problem solving

References
Harel, I. & Papert, S. (editors) (1991). Constructionism . Norwood, NJ: Ablex Publishing Corporation.
Kafai, Y., & Resnick, M., (1996). Constructionism in practice: Designing, thinking, and learning in a digital world. New Jersey: Lawrence Erlbaum Associates, Inc. 
Logo Computer Systems Inc., 1999, Logo Philosophy and Implementation.  LCSI. What is Logo? And Who Needs It?
Papert, Seymour (1980).Mindstorms.New York:Basic Books.
Papert, Seymour (1993)."The Children's Machine: Rethinking School in the Age of the Computer. New York: Basic Books.
Resnick, Mitchel.(in press). Computer as Paint Brush:Technology, Play and the Creative Society.To be published in: Singer, D., Golinkoff. R., and Hirsh-Pasek, K. (eds.) Play = Learning: How play motivates and enhances children's cognitive and social-emotional growth.  Oxford University Press.
Resnick, M. (1994). Turtles, termites and traffic jams. Massachusetts: MIT Press.
Resnick, M. (2002).  Rethinking learning in the digital age.  In The global information technology report:Readiness for the networked world.Edited by G. Kirkham. Oxford University Press. 
Skillen, P. (2003). Transferring Knowledge with Technology. Learning and Leading With Technology. ISTE.Volume 30, (4) p.22-27.

External links
video interview with Seymour Papert
LCSI The MicroWorlds JR product website includes demos, project examples, project information and important links.
Seymour Papert An excellent collection of the articles and works of Seymour Papert.
Gary Stager A teacher and teacher educator specializing in laptop education,  Logo, and Robotics.
Math Cats Some good examples of MicroWorlds EX projects.
MaMaMedia Idit Harel's excellent site for children.  The "For Grown-Ups" section has thought provoking articles about 21st Century Learning, including use of Logo
StarLogo Models and explores the workings of decentralized systems and emergent phenomena like bird flocks, traffic jams, and market economies
Lifelong Kindergarten Mitchel Resnick's Lifelong Kindergarten Group at MIT; provides information about programmable bricks and  crickets
The Logo Foundation A foundation that provides support for Logo users and educators
MW Forum New and experienced users share questions, ideas and projects about MW

Educational programming languages
Logo programming language family